is a 1970 Japanese film directed by Masahiro Shinoda. It was Japan's submission to the 43rd Academy Awards for the Academy Award for Best Foreign Language Film, but was not accepted as a nominee. Screen play by Shuji Terayama.

Cast
Tatsuya Nakadai - Naojiro Kataoka
Shima Iwashita - Michitose
Shoichi Ozawa - Ushimatsu
Fumio Watanabe - Moritaya Seizo
Masakane Yonekura - Kaneko Ichinojo
Kei Yamamoto
Goro Tarumi
Atsuo Nakamura
Jun Hamamura - Kanoke-boshi
Kamatari Fujiwara
Yukio Ninagawa
Kiwako Taichi - Namiji

See also
 List of submissions to the 43rd Academy Awards for Best Foreign Language Film
 List of Japanese submissions for the Academy Award for Best Foreign Language Film

References

External links

1970 films
Films directed by Masahiro Shinoda
1970s Japanese-language films
Films produced by Sanezumi Fujimoto
1970s Japanese films